Kenneth J. Zucker (born 1950) is an American-Canadian psychologist and sexologist. He was named editor-in-chief of Archives of Sexual Behavior in 2001. He was psychologist-in-chief at Toronto's Centre for Addiction and Mental Health (CAMH) and head of its Gender Identity Service until its closure in December 2015. Zucker is a professor in the departments of psychiatry and psychology at the University of Toronto.

Zucker collaborated with Susan Bradley, collecting clinical and research data over a period of twenty years and became an international authority on gender dysphoria in children (GDC) and adolescents. In 2007, Zucker was chosen to be a member of the American Psychological Association Task Force on Gender Identity, Gender Variance, and Intersex Conditions, and in 2008 he was named chair of the American Psychiatric Association workgroup on "Sexual and Gender Identity Disorders" for the 2012 edition of the DSM-5. He previously served on workgroups for the DSM-IV and the DSM-IV-TR.

Zucker's views and therapeutic approach have attracted criticism from several advocates and mental health professionals. Citing a review by two adolescent psychiatrists stating that CAMH was out of step with current practices for transgender youth, CAMH fired Zucker and closed the clinic. They later apologized to Zucker and paid him a financial settlement after one of the complaints in the review was found to be false. Zucker was featured in a BBC2 documentary in 2017.

Life
Zucker was born in 1950 to Jewish parents and grew up in Skokie, Illinois. Zucker received his B.A. from Southern Illinois University, his M.A. from Roosevelt University, and his Ph.D. from University of Toronto in 1982. He holds a certification from College of Psychologists of Ontario.

Zucker became interested in gender identity after reading Richard Green's 1974 book Sexual Identity Conflict in Children and Adults. Zucker's graduate work in developmental psychology resulted in his master's thesis on normative gender identity development in children. While in graduate school, Zucker met his future collaborator, Susan Bradley, a child psychiatrist on staff at the Child and Adolescent Service of the Clarke Institute of Psychiatry (now the Child and Family Studies Centre of the Centre for Addiction and Mental Health), a public mental health centre and teaching hospital of the University of Toronto Faculty of Medicine.

Zucker was impressed with the Clarke Institute and met with then chief of psychology, Kingsley Ferguson, who told Zucker of Bradley's new working group assessing children and adolescents with gender identity problems. He joined Bradley's group.

Therapeutic intervention for gender variance

Methods
Since the mid-1970s, Zucker has treated about 500 preadolescent gender-variant children to have them accept the gender identity they were assigned at birth until they are at an age he believes they may determine their own gender identity. Zucker has stated he has tried to encourage children to accept their birth sex and supports them in transitioning if they still experience gender dysphoria into adolescence.

For children assigned as male at birth (AMAB), Zucker reportedly asked parents to take away toys associated with girls, and to instruct their child not to play alongside or draw pictures of girls. However, one of the parents that originally made this claim has more recently expressed that there was a miscommunication in the original interview and that such directives were to treat the social isolation that stemmed from her son's obsession with dolls.

Psychologist Darryl Hill wrote that Zucker and Bradley believed that conversion treatments can reduce rejection by enabling gender non-conforming children to mix with children of the same sex, reducing the possibility of adult gender dysphoria.

Among Zucker's publications is the case history of one patient who was male by birth but underwent a penectomy and was shortly thereafter reassigned as female. The publication drew comparisons to the case history of David Reimer, who recalled not feeling "comfortable" as a girl after having transitioned. In contrast, the publication's case study did not recant her transition when questioned at age 16 and later at age 26. In both cases, the patients reported more masculine behavior and bisexuality, about which Zucker suspects that gender role and sexual orientation develop mostly before birth while gender identity development begins shortly after birth. There is some support for the position that "prenatal sex differentiation can at least sometimes trump social influences."

In 1994, Zucker said that parents set the goals at his clinic. "We recommend that one goal be to help the child feel more secure about his or her actual gender, another to deal with the child's emotional difficulties, and a third to help with problems in the family. It's helpful to have parents set limits on things like cross-dressing, which many parents have not done before coming to us." Zucker's follow-up of 50 treated children found that "about 10 percent are still very unhappy about their gender, still cross-dressing, and thinking about having sex reassignment surgery" as young adults. Zucker has stated that "the therapist must rely on the 'clinical wisdom' that has accumulated and to utilize largely untested case formulation conceptual models to inform treatment approaches and decisions."

Zucker coauthored a statistical report with J. Michael Bailey that found gay men and lesbians exhibited more cross-gender activity as children.

For adolescent clients expressing gender identity disorder, Zucker's treatment protocol resembles that for adult gender dysphoria, consisting of hormone replacement therapy to aid the adolescent in a social transition. Zucker's clinic does not provide recommendations for sex reassignment surgery – instead, clients are encouraged to pursue reassignment through the adult Gender Identity Clinic at CAMH, which controls funding for the procedure in Ontario.

Criticism
Critics have compared Zucker's approaches with conversion therapy. The Gay and Lesbian Medical Association believes "'reparative' therapy that seeks to reverse sexual orientation or gender identification" is an "extreme example" of bias that "may lead to increased self hatred and mental health problems."  Psychiatrist Simon Pickstone-Taylor has cited similarities between Zucker's therapeutic intervention and conversion therapy for homosexuals. Zucker responded that prevention of homosexuality was never a goal in their treatments and cites a lack of empirical evidence for the most effective approach. Journalist Marc Lostracco described Zucker's therapy as "well-meaning" but "problematic and harsh."

Others, like author Phyllis Burke, in her 1996 book Gender Shock: Exploding the Myths of Male and Female, objected to any diagnosis of gender dysphoria in children, considering it to be "child abuse". Zucker dismissed Burke's book as "simplistic" and "not particularly illuminating"; journalist Stephanie Wilkinson said Zucker characterized Burke's book as "the work of a journalist whose views shouldn't be put into the same camp as those of scientists like Richard Green or himself."

In February 2017, Zucker was slated to speak at a panel in Los Angeles for USPATH, the United States branch of WPATH. However, there was a protest by trans women who requested that Zucker be removed from the list of speakers, and who said that WPATH was grounded in cisnormativity and trans-exclusion. As a result, Zucker was removed from the list of speakers.

Closure of the CAMH Gender Identity Clinic for Children

Ontario conversion therapy ban
In January 2015, members of Rainbow Health Ontario, a provincial health promotion and navigation organization, approached CAMH expressing their concerns regarding Zucker's clinic. Rainbow Health Ontario submitted a review of academic literature and clinical practices for transgender youth, and expressed concern that the gender identity clinic was not following accepted practices. Others linked the Gender Identity Clinic's practices to suicide of transgender youth caused by conversion therapy, and referenced the high-profile case of Leelah Alcorn, a transgender teen from Ohio.

In February 2015, CAMH ordered an external review of its gender identity clinic for children and teens. A report from March 2015 stated that the review was the result of growing online scrutiny of CAMH for alleged conversion therapy practices. The same report stated that the clinic would not be accepting new patients until the review was finished.

In March 2015, the Ontario Provincial Parliament introduced the Affirming Sexual Orientation and Gender Identity Act, aimed at banning conversion therapy practices. In June 2015, the legislation was passed unanimously into law by the provincial parliament. The law made LGBT conversion therapy illegal to provide to minors, and removed it from public health insurance coverage for adults. After the bill was passed into law, CAMH stated that they welcomed the unanimous support for the bill.

External review
The external reviewers for the gender identity clinic were child and adolescent psychiatrists Suzanne Zinck of Halifax, and Antonio Pignatiello of Toronto. They invited stakeholders to comment on their experiences in the clinic. 

In November 2015, the external review was published. The review noted numerous strengths of the clinic, but also described it as an insular entity with an approach dissimilar from other clinics and described it as being out of step with current best practices, including WPATH SOC Version 7. They also raised concerns about clinicians asking age inappropriate questions.

Closure
After the review, CAMH shut down the clinic and fired Zucker. Kwame McKenzie, medical director of CAMH's child, youth, and family services, said "We want to apologize for the fact that not all of the practices in our childhood gender identity clinic are in step with the latest thinking" and that Zucker is, "no longer at CAMH." CAMH announced a process of consultation with community leaders to examine how best to offer care.

McKenzie said that Zucker's treatments were against the centre's guidelines. Prior to the review, he stated that there existed two schools of thought on such therapy for children under 11 among professionals.

Settlement
The client who accused Zucker of calling him a "vermin" withdrew his accusation, which was reported as false.

CAMH removed the report from its website and apologized, and replaced it with a summary of the report which has not survived a move to its new website.

Zucker sought legal justification with McKenzie and CAMH, for which CAMH again apologized to, and settled with Zucker, paying $586,000 in damages, legal fees, and interest.

When the settlement was announced, CAMH stated that it "stands by its decision to close the child and youth gender identity clinic following an external review which concluded the clinic was not meeting the needs of gender-expansive and trans children and their families", adding that "We believe our modernized approach to delivering services to youth better supports diverse patients through best practice and timely care."

DSM-5
Several LGBT activists spoke out against Zucker's 2008 appointment to the DSM-5 working group. The National Gay and Lesbian Task Force issued a statement questioning the APA's decision to appoint Zucker and a second member of the work panel. According to a response released by American Psychiatric Association, Zucker does not advocate conversion therapy for transgender adults or for trans youth in all cases, and he opposes change therapy for gay people under all circumstances.

Archives of Sexual Behavior
As editor of Archives of Sexual Behavior, Zucker published a controversial study on conversion therapy by Robert Spitzer. According to The New York Times, after his presentation of the study caused controversy, Spitzer asked Zucker to publish it. "I knew Bob and the quality of his work, and I agreed to publish it," Zucker said in an interview. "But I told him I would do it only if I also published commentaries". Spitzer later recanted the study's conclusions.

Publications
According to the Web of Science, Zucker has published almost 100 articles in peer-reviewed journals. These articles have been cited over 2000 times, with an h-index of 20. He has published several books, including:
 Gender Identity Disorder and Psychosexual Problems in Children and Adolescents (1995)
 Attachment and Psychopathology (1997)
 Ex-Gay Research: Analyzing the Spitzer Study And Its Relation to Science, Religion, Politics, and Culture (2006)

References

External links
Zucker's personal website

Further reading
Article on Kenneth Zucker's work in The Atlantic (2008).
Interview with Dr. Kenneth Zucker in GayOut (no date).

1950 births
Living people
21st-century American psychologists
American sexologists
Canadian psychologists
Canadian sexologists
Jewish American academics
Roosevelt University alumni
Sexual orientation and medicine
Southern Illinois University alumni
Transgender studies academics
University of Toronto alumni
Academic staff of the University of Toronto
20th-century American psychologists